The Municipality of Ljutomer is a municipality in northeastern Slovenia, some  east of Maribor. Traditionally it was part of the region of Styria. It is now included in the Mura Statistical Region. Its largest settlement and the administrative seat is Ljutomer.

Geography

Settlements

In addition to the municipal seat of Ljutomer, the municipality also includes the following settlements:

 Babinci
 Bodislavci
 Branoslavci
 Bučkovci
 Cezanjevci
 Cuber
 Cven
 Desnjak
 Drakovci
 Globoka
 Godemarci
 Gresovščak
 Grlava
 Ilovci
 Jeruzalem
 Krapje
 Krištanci
 Kuršinci
 Mala Nedelja
 Mekotnjak
 Moravci v Slovenskih Goricah
 Mota
 Noršinci pri Ljutomeru
 Nunska Graba
 Plešivica
 Podgradje
 Precetinci
 Presika
 Pristava
 Radomerje
 Radomerščak
 Radoslavci
 Rinčetova Graba
 Šalinci
 Sitarovci
 Slamnjak
 Spodnji Kamenščak
 Stara Cesta
 Stročja Vas
 Vidanovci
 Vogričevci
 Železne Dveri
 Zgornji Kamenščak

Notable people
The Ljutomer area was the birthplace of the ethnologist and Romantic poet Stanko Vraz (1810–1851), linguist Franz Miklosich (1813–1891), pioneer of film making Karol Grossmann (1864–1929), and painter Ante Trstenjak (1894–1970).

References

External links

Municipality of Ljutomer on Geopedia
Ljutomer municipal site

Ljutomer
1994 establishments in Slovenia